Pappireddipatti is a Town Panchayat of Dharmapuri district in the Indian state of Tamil Nadu and also a revenue Taluk of Dharmapuri district.

Pappireddipatti is the business center for villages surrounding it and for the people living in villages of Shevaroy Hills.

Geography 
It is almost surrounded by hills in all directions; mainly Kalrayan Hills in the East and Shevaroy Hills in the west. 

Vaniyar Dam, one of the big dams in Dharmapuri district is located at 5 km from Pappireddipatti, built in the foothills of Shevaroy Hills across the Vaniyar river a major tributary of Ponnaiyar River. The Dam has a capacity to hold 418 mcft water with a depth of 65 ft  and connected to the lakes of Venkatasamuthram, Aalapuram, Onthiampatti, Thenkaraikottai and Parayapatti via channels. There is small park and officer's quarters available near the dam. The dam is scenic and people can reach Yercaud by a long walk through the Shrevarayan forest.

The dam receives water from its catchment area in Shevaroy Hills. Water will be flowing to the dam only during Monsoon season and remains dry if monsoon fails. During 29 November 2010, water level of the dam reached 64.29 ft against its full depth of 65 feet.

Climate 
Pappireddipatti has a Warm and Dry climate (Köppen), with monsoonal influences typical of India. Pappireddipatti area is drained by Vaniyar river system by its tributaries like Kallar, Veppadi aaru and Krukkampatti aaru.

Geology 
Pappireddipatti area is covered by hard Crystalline rock. Hydrological soil group 'D' with slow rate of infiltration covers more than half of this area.

Quartz is available at Peddampatti Village of Pappireddipatti.

Demographics
As of 2011 census of India, Pappireddipatti had a population of 9,369. Males and females constitute roughly 50:50 of the population. Pappireddipatti has a literacy rate of 73%, on par with the national average but lesser than the state literacy rate of 80.1%. Male literacy is 79%, and female literacy is 67%. In Pappireddipatti, 8% of the population is under 6 years of age.

Festival
While Kaanum Pongal, the fourth day of Pongal festival, people visit Vaniyar Dam to spend their time with family, relatives and friends.

Transport
Pappireddipatti is well connected by roads to the nearby city Salem and district headquarters Dharmapuri.
The nearest railway station is at Bommidi, 16.4 km from Pappireddipatti. The nearest airport is at Salem, 42 km.

Picture Gallery

Industries

References

Cities and towns in Dharmapuri district